Josiah Cleaveland Cady (January 1837 – April 17, 1919) or J. Cleaveland Cady, was an American architect who is known for his Romanesque and Rundbogenstil style designs. He was also a founder of the American Institute of Architects.

More than fifteen of his buildings are on the National Register of Historic Places. His most famous surviving building is the American Museum of Natural History in New York City. In 1920, Alexander Dana Noyes said, "In his professional career, J. Cleveland Cady was perhaps the embodiment of the effort of American architecture, fifty years ago, to find itself while cutting loose from the false and meretricious standards of the Second Empire."

Early life
Cady was born in Providence, Rhode Island to Lydia Smith Platner and Josiah Cady, a Deacon who was president of the Rhode Island State Anti-Slavery Society. His father died in 1853.

Cady attended Bacon Academy and Plainfield Academy, both in Connecticut. He attended Trinity College in Hartford, Connecticut for one year in 1857, and took additional classes in 1860. At Trinity, he was a member of the Fraternity of Delta Psi (St. Anthony Hall). However, he did not officially graduate.

Between 1857 and 1864, Cady pursued his studies in architecture. He received his architectural training from a German professor of architecture who was living in New York City. He also studied watercolor painting with Alfred Fredericks.

Career 
Cady worked as a paid draftsman for Town & Davis in New York City. By 1864, he opened his practice, J. Cleaveland Cady, Architect. He advertised that he could provide designs and plans for churches, cottages, public buildings, residences, schools, stores, and warehouses. The Brooklyn Union described Cady as "a young man of fine talents, of refined and cultivated taste, and profoundly zealous in his profession." From 1864 to 1881, his offices were in the Trinity Building at 111 Broadway in Manhattan which served as a studio for dozens of architects, providing opportunities for many collaborations. In 1864, he was working with associates Rider & Alden in Hartford, Connecticut. In May 1869, he was associated with architect Henry M. Cougdon.

In 1871 Milton See (1854 – 1920) joined his practice, followed by Louis DeCoppet Berg (1856 – 1945) in 1873. Both were just seventeen years old when they began working with Cady. In 1882, he formed the firm J. C. Cady & Company. In 1890, the firm became known as Cady, Berg & See. With formal training in Germany, Berg was the structural and mechanical engineer for the firm. See was the chief technician, while Cady was the "chief designer." Their offices were located at 31 East 17th Street in New York City. They were joined by student draftsman William S. Gregory (1865 – 1945) in 1892. The firm dissolved in 1909.

Cady and Gregory formed a partnership known as Cady & Gregory in 1909. They had offices at 40 West 32nd Street in New York City.

Projects

Cultural buildings

Brooklyn Academy of Design 
In 1869, Cady received his big break with the commission to build the Brooklyn Art Association's Brooklyn Academy of Design. For this project, he worked with architect Henry M. Cougdon in what appears to be their only collaboration. They executed the stone building in high Victorian Gothic style in tones of brown, grey and pink. Opening in 1872, the Brooklyn Academy of Design included exhibition space and studios for artists. The building was pictured in The American Architect and Building News in January 1876.

Although this is not the style Cady is known for, architect Montgomery Schuyler said the Brooklyn Academy of Design is "one of the few successful secular Gothic designs."

Peabody Museum 

Cady also designed the original Peabody Museum of Natural History to house Yale University's mineral collection, fossils, and exhibits on zoology and geology. The Gothic style building was constructed between 1873 and 1876 from brown and Nova Scotia stone, as well as Philadelphia-pressed brick. However, only a portion of Cady's design was ever constructed. The museum was located at the corner of Elm and High Streets but was demolished in 1917.

Barron Library 

Cady designed the Barron Library in Middlesex, New Jersey in 1878. This brownstone in Romanesque style has a Roman arch, a three-story tower, and stained-glass windows. It was built of Belleville stone. Inside, the Reading Room's fireplace is outlined in Delft tiles depicting Bible scenes.

Metropolitan Opera House 

Cady was the architect of the original Metropolitan Opera House which opened in October 1883. To get this contract, the firm won a design contest, gaining the advantage because of its inexpensive construction costs, functionality, and fireproofing. It also incorporated the newest engineering technologies, including electric lights, elevators, an iron cage for structural support, a sprinkler system for fire suppression, and a simple air conditioning system. The latter made the designer "a true architectural pioneer." When completed, it seated 3,700 people and was the largest opera house in the world. Its four-story façade had matching seven-story towers with commercial establishments on the ground level, restaurants and ballrooms above, and apartments for bachelors in the upper levels—making this "an early and excellent example of a multi-use project." Its plans were published in The American Architect, February 16, 1884.

Cady described the building as, "a simple dignity that will not be tiresome or uninteresting as the years go by." Although its yellow brick and terracotta exterior was not particularly noteworthy, the Historic American Buildings Survey noted, "its interior placed it among the great opera houses of the world." Cady's original auditorium was destroyed by a fire on August 27, 1892; it was rebuilt by the architectural firm of Carrère and Hastings and was used until 1966. However, in 1936, it was noted, "The opera house was designed by J. C. Cady, a prominent architect of the day. That Mr. Cady was without experience in theater construction seemed to matter little; audiences ever since have paid for his mistakes, as but half the stage can be seen from the side seats of the balcony and family circle." The opera house was razed in 1967.

For a while, the Vaudeville Club used the Met's auditorium. In consultation with the architect Stanford White, Cady designed the Concert Hall of the Vaudeville Club. The club would later become the Met's Friends group.

American Museum of Natural History 

Cady, Berg & See designed the main building of the American Museum of Natural History (1899) in New York City. The firm was selected through a design contest held in 1877. The museum's Romanesque design was very open because of iron supports beneath the red granite façade. Running 710 feet along the museum's West 77th Street entrance, this was the longest public building façade in New York City. It included black cherry window frames, elaborate cornices, cartouches, eagles, finials, wreaths, and a 112-foot-wide porte-cochère. It "has been hailed as one of the finest examples of Romanesque Revival architecture in New York City." Inside, the building reflected a new approach to museum design; it included spaces for both public exhibitions and scholarly study.

Colleges 
Cady, Berg & See designed buildings for many college including Bellevue Medical School, Berea Collage, Trinity College, Wesleyan University, Williams College, and Yale University.

Trinity College 
At Trinity College, Cady designed Saint Anthony Hall (1878), a chapter house for the Fraternity of Delta Psi (aka St. Anthony Hall). Robert Habersham Coleman, a former classmate and fraternity brother of Cady, donated the funds to construct the chapter house. Cady's design departed "from the traditional 'tomb-like' structures of fraternities at other schools…" Instead, his Romanesque fraternity house "was more a cross between a house and fortress." He also designed the Jarvis Hall of Science (1899) at Trinity, which was demolished in the 1960s.

Yale University 
For Yale, Cady designed more than fifteen buildings, including Berkeley Hall (1893–94, demolished), Chittenden Memorial Library (1889–90), Dwight Hall which included the YMCA (1885–86, demolished 1926) Fayerweather Hall (1900–01, demolished), Hendrie Hall (1894–97), Lampson Hall (1903, demolished), Lyceum Hall (1903, demolished), North Sheffield School (1873), Pierson Hall (1896, demolished), Sheffield Chemical Laboratory (1894–95), White Hall (1893–94, demolished), Winchester Hall (1892–93, demolished), and the Yale Infirmary (1892).

George Brush, head of the engineering department at Yale's Sheffield Scientific School praised North Sheffield Hall, saying, "The building is considered a complete success; great surprise is expressed that with so simple an external form—a mere cube—such an admirable architectural effect has been produced, and the interior arrangements are so simple, complete and substantial, that everyone is impressed with the fact, that nothing has been sacrificed to mere decoration, but everything is for use. …[Cady has] furnished a substantial, common sense building, massive, but elegant in design, and pleasingly artistic in its general appearance, while it is thoroughly well adapted for the uses of our institution."

Although only part of the Chittenden Library design was constructed, it is Cady's "most overtly Richardsonian building." However, "the best remaining example of the superb craftsmanship of Cady's buildings" is probably Sheffield Chemical Laboratory.

Williams College 
In 1883, Cady designed the dormitory Morgan Hall for Williams Collage. This was followed by a Lasell Gymnasium in 1886. Both buildings are a mix of Romanesque and Dutch styles and were executed in Kentucky and Williamstown limestone.

Wesleyan University 
Cady's work at Wesleyan started with a boiler plant in 1891. His next commission was Fayerweather Gymnasium in 1889. Cady's Romanesque interpretation of a gym started a trend of Romanesque buildings on the Wesleyan campus. However, Berg's expertise in engineering was also essential in the wide spans of the gymnasium. The firm also designed additions to Memorial Chapel in 1898. In 1904, construction started on Wilbur Fisk Hall, another of their designs.

Bellevue Medical School 
Cady also designed the Bellevue Medical School (1897), later known as the New York University Medical School. The Beaux-Arts style building is located at the southwest corner of 26th Street in New York City. Its first floor has arched windows outlined with wedge-shaped bricks.

Berea College 
Cady was the main architectural advisor for the Berea College Square. He was also the uncle of Berea College President William Frost. Cady, along with landscape architect John Charles Olmsted, convinced Frost to select Colonial Revival style for the campus' architectural theme, rather than the obvious choice of rustic style for Appalachia. In 1906, Cady wrote to Frost:Such buildings would be proper for the forest reserves, farms, and farm laborers and even some men’s dormitories, but not on the main campus…If the College’s buildings seem merely to repeat the student’s old mountain environments, they will not be in line with the work their studies are doing for them. As they acquire education and a knowledge of the world, though they live in the mountains, they will hardly be content to live in the same cabins, and their regard and veneration for the College that helped them, will not likely be increased by the recollection of it as mainly a cluster of cabins… A College of log cabins would be a nightmare!Cady designed Fairfield Hall (1873), also known as Ladies Hall, which was the first brick building on campus. Its eclectic design combines Italianate and Second Empire styles in a three-story structure. He also designed the brick and wood Berea College Hospital (1908, razed 1954) which was turned into a dormitory called Morningside Cottage in 1925. Cady designed the Colonial Revival style Boone Tavern as a hotel for Berea College in 1909. The three-story hotel has Neoclassical porticos with columns that are two-stories tall. It was constructed by Berea students in three phases.

Around 1912, Frost asked his uncle to design a new teacher education building. As a gift to the college, Cady donated much of his time working on the project. Knapp Hall was dedicated on December 16, 1913. The small building housed 200 students, but Cady had designed it to use every space efficiently with little waste. To give the classrooms the best light possible, he extended the windows to the ceiling and placed the building on a true north axis. He also developed adjacent playgrounds.

Churches 
Cady with credited with designing 25 church buildings using a variety of styles. A Presbyterian, Cady avoided the traditional Anglican and Catholic cruciform plan but instead used the English “dissenting chapel” arrangement.

He designed two churches in Norwood, New Jersey in the Gothic revival style: the Alpine Community Church (1867) and the Church of the Holy Communion (1886-88). He used Stick style or Carpenter Gothic style for the Church in the Adirondacks in Racquette Lake, New York; the First Presbyterian Church of Oyster Bay (1873) in Oyster Bay, New York; and the Plantsville Congregational Church (1866) in Southington, Connecticut. St. William's Catholic Church (1890) in Long Lake, New York was designed by Cady in the shingle style. This one-story building has a two-story round tower with a cone-shaped roof. On the interior, the entire ceiling is hand-stenciled.

Cady used a traditional Byzantine church plan for the First Presbyterian Church (1889) in Wilkes-Barre, Pennsylvania and the Hampton Memorial Church (1886) at the Hampton Institute in Hampton, Virginia. The latter features a square tower that is 150 feet tall and has a clock on all four sides. Inside, the wood trim is adorned with carved African American faces, and the yellow pine pews were built by students from the Hampton trade school.

Cady's preferred style for churches was Romanesque, including the Church of the Redeemer in Paterson, New Jersey; First Church Congregational in Fairfield, Connecticut; First Presbyterian Church in Albany, New York; First Presbyterian Church (1901) in Ithaca, New York; Good Shepherd–Faith Presbyterian Church (1887–1893) in New York City; Presbyterian Church in Greenwich, Connecticut; South Street Presbyterian Church of Morristown, New Jersey; and the Webb Memorial Church in Madison, New Jersey.

Some of his many churches in New York City include the Broome Street Tabernacle (1884–85), First Presbyterian Church on Brownell Street, Forsyth Street Synagogue (1890) which is now the Seventh Day Adventist Church, Grace Methodist Episcopal Church (1895; demolished), Gustavus Adolphus Swedish Lutheran Church (1887), New York Avenue Methodist Episcopal Church (1889–92) which is now Union United Methodist Church, Olivet Memorial Church, the Pilgrim Chapel for the Church of the Pilgrims (1878), the Presbyterian Church of the Covenant at the Mission (1871), St. Andrew's Methodist Church (1889–90) which is now West Side Institutional Synagogue, and St. Paul's German Lutheran Church of Williamsburgh.

One of his designs was replicated several times. In 1880, he designed the Church of the Good Shepherd at Raquette Lake, New York. In 1881, those plans were modified at the request of Harriet Beecher Stowe for the Church of Our Saviour in Mandarin, Florida. The plans were used again in 1883 for the Church of the Good Shepherd in Beattystown, New Jersey.

Health and welfare 
The New York Association for Improving the Condition of the Poor (AICP) hired Cady, Berg & See to design the People's Bath at 9 Centre Market Place in the Lower East Side. This became "one of the most successful and well-publicized public baths in nineteenth-century America." As a result, the firm became the official architect for future designs of municipal baths in New York City.

In 1895, they were asked to submit a design for a grander bath facility for Tompkins Square Park—it was to include eighty shows. This was to be the first of a series of five bathhouses. However, the community protested against having such a facility in their park, and it was never built. However, a reworked version of their design was eventually used by New York City for the Rivington Street Baths. The AICP criticized both New York City and the architects for what they called "a pretentious brick structure," finding it too grand, too large, and too expensive for the bathhouse scheme they had in mind.

Cady designed the Hudson Street Hospital (1893), Presbyterian Hospital (1886), and the New York Skin and Cancer Hospital (1898). They also designed a House of Relief (1894) on Hudson Street near the Hudson Street Hospital, both of which were operated by the New York Hospital. This five-story House of Relief with its distinctive twin stairway was used for clinical and emergency services.

Cady, Berg & See also designed the Christian Home for Intemperate Men (1881) on Madison Avenue, a Home for Old Men and Aged Couples (1897, demolished 1973) at Morningside Heights, and the Protestant Half Orphan Asylum (1893) on Manhattan Avenue.

Residential 
In the February 1874 edition of The New–York Sketch–Book of Architecture, Cady shared a design for a Country-Home, which is a highly ornate mansion. The client's name and the building location is unknown.

Cady, Berg & See designed around fifteen residential projects in New York City including those at 57– 65 East 90th Street in Manhattan which are now in the Carnegie Hill Historic District and 16 and 8 –14 Pierrepont Street in the Brooklyn Heights Historic District.

Designed by Cady, the Romanesque style Othniel C. Marsh House was built from 1875 to 1880 in New Haven. At the time, this "fortress-like mansion" was quite different from the Queen Anne style that was popular in New Haven. It is built of rough-cut red sandstone that is, perhaps, Cady's nod to Marsh's profession as the first professor of paleontology in the United States, with a stick-style wooden tower. The interior, which was finished three years after the exterior, featured dark, heavy woodwork and carved and polished fireplaces. The first floor featured The Wigwam, an octagonal room to showcase Marsh's collections. Marsh bequeathed the house to Yale University in 1899. It is now called Marsh Hall and contains classrooms and offices for the School of Forestry and Environmental Studies.

In 1876, Cady designed Cliffside, a stone mansion in Palisades, New York. This Dutch Colonial Revival style house is also known as the H. E. Lawrence Estate. Another country house with the similar use of a gambrel roof is Willelyn, built 1883–84 for Edward A. and Mary Wickes in Balmville, New York. Designed in the Shingle Style, it uses colonial motifs. The house was later owned by Senator Thomas Desmond and Alice Curtis Desmond, who donated it to Mount Saint Mary College as the Desmond Center upon her death.   

The Charles H. Farnam Residence at 28 Hillhouse Avenue in New Haven was built in 1884 for attorney Charles Henry Farnam. Its design is eclectic but has similarities to Dutch Colonial style. The red brick house has arched windows and an octagonal corner tower, Yale University has owned the structure since 1920 and uses it for the Department of Economics.

Commercial 
In 1872, Cady designed the Demarest Railroad Depot in Bergen County, New Jersey. In 1878, he designed an office in Dutch style for Harper Brother's Publishing House. American Architect and Building News said, "The whole room is the quaintest of quaint—a place to linger in."

Cady designed four commercial buildings that were considered skyscrapers in their day—the nine-story Gallatin Bank Building (1886, demolished) in New York City, the ten-story Lancashire Fire Insurance Company (1889) in New York City, the twelve-story Shoe and Leather Bank (1893) in New York City, and the Phoenix Mutual Life Insurance Company (1897, demolished) in Hartford, Connecticut. The seven-story retail and residential towers of the Metropolitan Opera House were also considered skyscrapers.

Cady was Richard Morris Hunt's biggest rival for the Tribune Tower competition; although the latter eventually won and designed the building in New York. However, Cady published his design in the July 1874 edition of The New–York Sketch–Book of Architecture.

Professional affiliations 
In 1857, Cady was a founder of the American Institute of Architects (AIA). However, Cady did not become an AIA member until he was working professionally in 1864. He was made an AIA Fellow in 1865.

Cady gave a presentation on old Dutch farmhouses of colonial New Jersey to the AIA New York City chapter. He also published a paper on opera houses in the AIA journal.

Honors
 Trinity College presented Cady with an honorary M.A. in 1880, followed by an honorary LL.D. in 1905.
 Cady's architectural library of more than 400 volumes is housed in Watkinson Library at Trinity College. This is "one of the few intact architectural libraries of nineteenth-century America, allowing a rare glimpse into the working method of one of the era's major architectural firms.'
 In 1993 Trinity College hosted the exhibition "Forgotten Architect of the Gilded Age: Josiah Cleaveland Cady's Legacy" with a catalog by Kathleen A. Curran
 Buildings designed by Cady which are listed on the National Register of Historic Places include:
American Museum of Natural History, Central Park West and 77th Street, New York, New York (Cady, Berg & See), 1899
Barron Library, 582 Rahway Avenue, Woodbridge Township, New Jersey (J. Cleaveland Cady), 1878
Boone Tavern, 100 Main Street, Berea, Kentucky (Cady and See), 1909
Church of the Holy Communion, Summit Avenue, Norwood, New Jersey (J. Cleveland Cady), 1886-88
Cliffside, Lawrence Ln. S of River Road, Palisades, New York (J. Cleaveland Cady), 1876
Demarest Railroad Depot, 38 Park Street, Demarest, New Jersey (J. Cleaveland Cady), 1872
First Presbyterian Church of Albany, Albany, New York (J. Cleaveland Cady), 1901
 First Presbyterian Church of Ithaca, Ithaca, New York (J. Cleaveland Cady), 1901
First Presbyterian Church of Oyster Bay, East Main Street, Oyster Bay, New York (J. Cleaveland Cady), 1873
First Presbyterian Church, Wilkes-Barre, Pennsylvania (J. Cleaveland Cady), part of the River Street Historic District, 1889
First Romanian-American Congregation Synagogue, 89-93 Rivington Street, New York, New York (J. C. Cady & Company)
Grace Episcopal Church, 15515 Jamaica Avenue, Queens, New York (Cady, Berg & See) 1901-02
Hampton University Memorial Church, Hampton University, Hampton, Virginia (J. C. Cady), 1886
Othniel C. Marsh House, 360 Prospect Street, New Haven, Connecticut (J. Cleaveland Cady), 1878
Presbyterian Church of the Covenant, Manhattan, New York (J. Cleavland Cady), New York City Tudor City Historic District, 1871
Saint Anthony Hall, 340 Summit Street, Hartford, Connecticut (Josiah Cleaveland Cady), 1878
St. William's Catholic Church, Long Point on Raquette Lake, Long Lake, New York (J. C. Cady & Company), 1890
One or more properties in Upper Closter-Alpine Historic District, roughly bounded by Forest Street, Old Dock Road, School House Lane, Church Street, and Closter Dock Road in Alpine, New Jersey (J. Cleaveland Cady)
One or more properties in Plantsville Historic District, roughly bounded by Prospect Street, Summer Street, Quinnipiac River, Grove Street, South Main Street, West Main Street, and West Street in Southington, Connecticut (Josiah Cleaveland Cady)

Personal 
In 1859, Cady married Julia Bulkley, daughter of the pioneering dermatologist Dr. Henry D. Bulkley of New York. They had one daughter, Alice Cleaveland Cady, before Julia died in 1869. In 1881, he married Emma Matilda  Bulkley of Orange, New Jersey. She was the second daughter of Dr. Bulkley. They had three children, including Julia Bulkley Cady, Cleaveland Cady, and Lyndon Bulkley Cady.

Cady was a devoted Presbyterian who served as head of the Sunday school at the Presbyterian Church of the Covenant for 53 years. He was president of the National Federation of Churches and a member of the Religious Education Association. Cady also ran weekly prayer meetings at the Covenant Mission at the Presbyterian Church of the Covenant. He was vice–president of the New York City Mission for ten years, serving on the board for seventeen years. He was a trustee of Berea College, governor of the Presbyterian Hospital, and president of the New York Skin and Cancer Hospital.

He was a member of the Alpine Club, the American Library Association, the Century Association, the Quill Club, and the St. Anthony Club of New York.

In 1919, he died at 82 in his home at 214 Riverside Drive after two months of illness. He was buried at Woodlawn Cemetery in the Bronx, New York.

References

More information
Schuyler, Montgomery. "The Works of Cady, Berg & See."  The Architectural Record VI (July 1896-June 1897):  pp. 516–553

1837 births
1919 deaths
People from Providence, Rhode Island
American Presbyterians
Bacon Academy alumni
Trinity College (Connecticut) alumni
St. Anthony Hall
19th-century American architects
20th-century American architects
Architects from New York City
Architects of Roman Catholic churches
Architects of Presbyterian churches
Romanesque Revival architects